Under the Tonto Rim is a lost 1928 American silent Western film directed by Herman C. Raymaker and starring Richard Arlen and Mary Brian. It is based on the novel a novel by Zane Grey and was remade in 1933 and 1947.

Cast
 Richard Arlen as Edd Denmeade
 Mary Brian as Lucy Watson
 Alfred Allen as Dad Denmeade
 Jack Luden as Bud Watson
 Harry T. Morey as Sam Spralls
 Billy Franey as 'One Punch' (credited as William Franey)
 Harry Todd as Bert
 Bruce Gordon as Killer Higgins
 Jack Byron as Middleton

References

External links

 
 

1928 films
1928 Western (genre) films
Films based on works by Zane Grey
Films based on American novels
Paramount Pictures films
Lost Western (genre) films
Lost American films
American black-and-white films
1928 lost films
Silent American Western (genre) films
Films directed by Herman C. Raymaker
1920s American films
1920s English-language films